Frederick Crane may refer to:

 Frederick Crane (Frasier), a character in Frasier
 Frederick E. Crane (1869–1947), American lawyer and politician from New York